The 1995 FIA Touring Car World Cup was the third and final running of the FIA Touring Car World Cup. It was held on 15 October 1995 at the Circuit Paul Ricard in France. Frank Biela won the event overall with a win and a second place in the two races, with Audi and BMW cars dominating both races.

Entry list

Results

Qualifying  

 Qualifying 1

Qualifying 2

Races

 Race 1

 Race 2

Championship standings
Scoring system

Drivers' standings

Manufacturers' Trophy

Manufactures Points System
 Top two best results of every Manufactures for each race.

References

 http://www.supertouringregister.com/series/88/
 http://www.ten-tenths.com/forum/showthread.php?t=128778
 http://www.motorsport-archive.com/results/season/1999
 Touring Car World 95/96 — The official book of Touring car

1995
Touring Car World Cup
Touring Car World Cup